The 2008–09 Cypriot Third Division was the 38th season of the Cypriot third-level football league. Akritas Chlorakas won their 2nd title.

Format
Fourteen teams participated in the 2008–09 Cypriot Third Division. All teams played against each other twice, once at their home and once away. The team with the most points at the end of the season crowned champions. The first three teams were promoted to the 2009–10 Cypriot Second Division and the last three teams were relegated to the 2009–10 Cypriot Fourth Division.

Point system
Teams received three points for a win, one point for a draw and zero points for a loss.

Changes from previous season
Teams promoted to 2008–09 Cypriot Second Division
 PAEEK FC
 Ethnikos Assia
 Chalkanoras Idaliou

Teams relegated from 2007–08 Cypriot Second Division
 Anagennisi Deryneia
 Akritas Chlorakas
 Olympos Xylofagou

Teams promoted from 2007–08 Cypriot Fourth Division
 Digenis Oroklinis
 Othellos
 Orfeas Nicosia

Teams relegated to 2008–09 Cypriot Fourth Division
 Anagennisi Germasogeias
 ENAD Polis Chrysochous
 Iraklis Gerolakkou

League standings

Results

See also
 Cypriot Third Division
 2008–09 Cypriot First Division
 2008–09 Cypriot Cup for lower divisions

Sources

Cypriot Third Division seasons
Cyprus
2008–09 in Cypriot football